Ioan Pap-Deac (born 17 October 1969) is a Romanian professional footballer who played as a goalkeeper.

References

External links
 

1969 births
Living people
People from Bihor County
Romanian footballers
Association football goalkeepers
Liga I players
Liga II players
FC Bihor Oradea players
FC Progresul București players
FC Olimpia Satu Mare players
FC Universitatea Cluj players
CS Minaur Baia Mare (football) players
ACF Gloria Bistrița players
FC Unirea Dej players